Robert J. Dolan is the town administrator of Lynnfield, Massachusetts. He was previously the mayor of Melrose, Massachusetts from 2002 to early 2018.

Dolan graduated from Melrose High School (1989), received his B.A. in political science from Fordham University, his Masters in Public Administration (MPA) from Northeastern University. In 2003, Dolan completed his certificate in Municipal Governance and Policy at the Rappaport Institute at Harvard Kennedy School. While at Fordham, he worked for a summer at Quincy Market in Boston's Faneuil Hall area, selling items from one of the infamous carts.

He served on the Melrose School Committee 1994–1998, serving as Vice Chairman 1996–98. He served on the Board of Aldermen as Alderman At Large 1998–2002; serving as president of the board in 2001. In November 2001, he was elected Mayor of Melrose serving in that position until 2018, when he was selected to be the town administrator of Lynnfield. He is married to Alison (Wilson) Dolan and they have one son and one daughter.

Year of birth missing (living people)
Living people
Mayors of Melrose, Massachusetts
People from Melrose, Massachusetts
Fordham University alumni
Harvard Kennedy School alumni
Northeastern University alumni
Massachusetts Democrats